Jack Nilson may refer to:
 Jack Nilson (footballer)
 Jack Nilson (fighter)